The Asian Cycling Championships is an annual continental cycling championships for road bicycle racing and track cycling since 1963, exclusively for Asian cyclists selected by the national governing body (member nations of the Asian Cycling Confederation).

Since 2017, competitions on road and track cycling are held separately.

Competitions

1963–2016

2017–present

Men's road events

Individual road race

Individual time trial

Team time trial

Women's road events

Individual road race

Individual time trial

Team time trial

Men's track events

Sprint

1 km time trial

Keirin

Individual pursuit

Points race

Scratch

Omnium

Madison

Team sprint

Team pursuit

Elimination race

Women's track events

Sprint

500m time trial

Keirin

Individual pursuit

Points race

Scratch

Omnium

Madison

Team sprint

Team pursuit

Elimination race

Notes
 Cancelled

 Men's event

 Women's event

 This event is held in late 2019 due to 2020 Summer Olympic track cycling's qualification timeline

References

External links
 
Official Website
 
 

 
Cycling
Asian
Cycle racing in Asia
Recurring sporting events established in 1963